The Boca Raton Old City Hall (labeled as "Town Hall" on signs) is a historic site in Boca Raton, Florida, United States. It is located at 71 North Federal Highway. The former city hall now houses the Boca Raton Welcome Center and the Boca Raton History Museum. On October 16, 1980, it was added to the U.S. National Register of Historic Places. The original design was by Addison Mizner. On April 18, 2012, the AIA's Florida Chapter placed it on its list of Florida Architecture: 100 Years. 100 Places as Boca Raton Town Hall.

The building housed Boca Raton's police station, fire department, and library. The bay for the fire engine is currently (2018) the gift shop.

Boca Raton History Museum

The Boca Raton History Museum is located in downtown Boca Raton, Florida. Sponsored by the Boca Raton Historical Society, whose offices and library are located there, it is also the welcome center for Boca Raton. The building it is housed in was Boca Raton's original town hall, which began as a commission in 1926 to well-known architect Addison Mizner, designated by the Boca Raton Council as town planner; some of his elegant details have been preserved, together with antiques, some of them Spanish, from his collection. (Because of Mizner's bankruptcy later that year, the building was completed by architect William E. Alsmeyer.) It also housed Boca's first fire bay (fire station), which now houses the museum's gift shop, Boca Raton's police station, and its first library. A small second floor, not currently (2016) open to the public, provided housing for the fire chief. The Boca Express Train Museum, a few blocks away, is also operated by the Historical Society.

References

External links
 Official site
 Florida's Office of Cultural and Historical Programs
 Palm Beach County listings
 Palm Beach County markers
 Boca Raton Old City Hall
 Three-dimensional tour of Boca Raton History Museum https://my.matterport.com/show/?m=2MXBdWMdWrk (retrieved November 1, 2016).
 Boca Raton Historical Museum Web site: http://bocahistory.org (retrieved November 1, 2016).

National Register of Historic Places in Palm Beach County, Florida
City and town halls in Florida
Former seats of local government
Addison Mizner buildings
City and town halls on the National Register of Historic Places in Florida